Overscreening, also called unnecessary screening, is the performance of medical screening without a medical indication to do so. Screening is a medical test in a healthy person who is showing no symptoms of a disease and is intended to detect a disease so that a person may prepare to respond to it. Screening is indicated in people who have some threshold risk for getting a disease, but is not indicated in people who are unlikely to develop a disease. Overscreening is a type of unnecessary health care.

Overscreening is problematic because it can lead to risky or harmful additional treatment when a healthy person gets a false positive result for screening which they should not have had. It also causes unnecessary stress for the person receiving the test, and it brings unnecessary financial costs that someone pays.

The general rule is that people should only be screened for a medical condition when there is a reason to believe that they ought to be screened, such a medical guideline recommendation for screening based on evidence from a person's medical history or physical examination.

Controversy and debate arise when new medical guidelines change screening recommendations.

Definition
Screening is a type of medical test which is done on health people who do not show symptoms of a medical condition. Screenings are correctly performed when done on a person who has significant risk of developing a medical condition, and incorrectly performed when done on a person whose risk is not significant.

There can be debate about when risk becomes great enough to become significant and merit a recommendation for screening, but in discussions about overscreening, this is not the cause of the problem. Overscreening almost always happens when a person is screened routinely and without any consideration of their risk for a medical condition.

One early use of the term "overscreening" as "unnecessary screening" was in 1992 in the context of cervical cancer screening.

A 1979 paper used the term "overscreening" to mean "false positive result in a screening".

Causes of overscreening

Same causes as unnecessary health care

Overscreening is a type of unnecessary health care, so the causes of unnecessary health care are also causes of overscreening. Some causes include financial biases for physicians to recommend more treatment in health care systems using fee-for-service and physician self-referral practices; and physicians' practice of defensive medicine.

Screening creep
Over time, recommendations to screen are made for populations with less risk in the past.

Clinical practice guidelines advise physicians to screen early to detect diseases. It has been considered that guideline committees might not appropriately do cost-effectiveness analysis, consider opportunity cost, or evaluate risks to patients when they broaden screening recommendations.

Diagnostic creep
Over time, the indicators for making a diagnosis are lower so that people with fewer symptoms are diagnosed with a disease sooner. Additionally, new diseases are named and treatment is recommended, including "subclinical diseases", "preclinical diseases", or "pseudodiseases", which are described as early versions of a disease which has not manifested.

Patient demand
Patient demand is a sort of self-diagnosis in which patients request treatment regardless of whether the treatment they request is medically indicated. Causes for patients requesting treatment include increased access to health information on the Internet and direct-to-consumer advertising.

Ethical concerns of screening under these circumstances have been described.

Distraction tricks by physicians
Physicians sometimes use screening as a placebo for patients who wish to have some kind of care. The physician may recommend screening to placate the patient's demand for fast recovery in times when the recommended action would be to do nothing except wait. Research suggests that patients are more satisfied with their treatment when it is or seems expensive because patients believe that the more care they get, even if it is not necessary, then at least doing something is better than doing nothing.

Arguments against overscreening

Overscreening is a type of unnecessary health care. One study about unnecessary screening before surgery reported that physicians order unnecessary tests because of tradition in the practice of medicine, anticipation that other physicians will expect the test results when they see the patient, defensive medicine, worries that a surgery may be canceled if the test is not done, and lack of understanding about when a test is actually indicated.

False positive medical test results
A false positive medical test result is a false-positive test result of medical screening. It happens when a test indicates that a person has a medical condition when actually the person does not.

Overscreening can be a problem because it can generate a false positive medical test result in a healthy person who does not have the medical condition which screening is supposed to detect. In such cases, the person who received the false positive test is more likely to get further unnecessary screening or even receive treatment for a condition which that person does not have. In either of these cases, the person becomes exposed to the risks and harms of treatment which they ought not be getting.

In general, people should not have medical screening unless the screening is indicated by the person's medical history, a physical examination, and a medical guideline. The rationale for this is that in cases in which a person is unlikely to have a medical condition, it can be more likely that a test will give a false positive result than it would be for the test to detect something which is unlikely considering the person's medical history. If a false positive result does occur in a patient unlikely to have that disease, then that patient will be likely to seek treatment.

Unnecessary costs
Overscreening tends to happen more in circumstances in which medical billing happens based on fee-for-service models rather than bundled payment. One reason for this is because health care providers have incentive to provide more services to increase their revenue. Furthermore, when patients are shielded from cost sharing, that also tends to increase rates of overscreening as when patients pay nothing for additional treatment, they tend to request more services even when they are not indicated.

Overscreening examples

Cancer screening

Prostate cancer screening

The United States Preventive Services Task Force (USPSTF) recommended against PSA screening in healthy men finding that the potential risks outweigh the potential benefits. Guidelines from the American Urological Association, and the American Cancer Society recommend that men be informed of the risks and benefits of screening.  The American Society of Clinical Oncology recommends screening be discouraged in those who are expected to live less than ten years, while in those with a life expectancy of greater than ten years a decision should be made by the person in question based on the potential risks and benefits.  In general, they conclude that based on recent research, "it is uncertain whether the benefits associated with PSA testing for prostate cancer screening are worth the harms associated with screening and subsequent unnecessary treatment."

Breast cancer screening

Recommendations to attend to mammography screening vary across countries and organizations, with the most common difference being the age at which screening should begin, and how frequently or if it should be performed, among women at typical risk for developing breast cancer. Some other organizations recommend mammograms begin as early as age 40 in normal-risk women, and take place more frequently, up to once each year. Women at higher risk may benefit from earlier or more frequent screening. Women with one or more first-degree relatives (mother, sister, daughter) with premenopausal breast cancer often begin screening at an earlier age, perhaps at an age 10 years younger than the age when the relative was diagnosed with breast cancer.

Heart related tests

Electrocardiography

Electrocardiograms are sometimes inappropriately used to screen low-risk patients with no symptoms for cardiac disease, perhaps as part of a routine annual exam. There is not much evidence that this test in low-risk individuals can improve health outcomes. False positive results, however, are likely to lead to follow-up invasive procedures, unnecessary further treatment, and a misdiagnosis. The harms of a non-indicated annual screening have been determined to outweigh the potential benefit, and for that reason, screening without an indication is discouraged.

Young athletes are sometimes screened with ECG as a requirement for them to play sports, and the necessity of this and harms from false positive results are debated.

Heart imaging stress tests

Cardiac stress tests, including stress echocardiography and nuclear stress tests, are used to detect a block in blood flow to the heart. They do this by taking pictures of the heart while the heart is exercising. Persons who have symptoms of heart disease or who are high risk for a heart attack may need this test, while people without these symptoms and who are low risk generally do not.

Coronary computed tomography
Coronary artery calcium scoring is a diagnostic test in the field of cardiovascular x-ray computed tomography. It is used to screen for coronary artery disease. Asymptomatic people who have low risk, including a lack of family history of premature coronary artery disease, should not be screened with this test. Coronary computed tomography angiography should not be used to screen people who are asymptomatic. Additionally, this test rarely provides insight which cannot be gained from coronary artery calcium scoring.

Opinions about overscreening
Overscreening has been called "unethical".

References

External links
PSA Testing Controversy Reignites ‘Over-Screening’ Debate, PBS Newshour

Unnecessary health care
Medical tests
Prevention